Lawrence Frederick Ratterman (August 9, 1912 – March 6, 1988) was an American football player.  Ratterman attended St. Mary's High School and Withrow High School in Cincinnati, Ohio before enrolling at the University of Michigan.  He played halfback and quarterback for the Michigan Wolverines football team in 1930, 1932, and 1933.  He also played professional football for the Cincinnati Reds for one game during the 1934 NFL season.  He was 0-for-3 passing and gained one yard on two carries as a rusher.

References

Michigan Wolverines football players
Cincinnati Reds (NFL) players
1912 births
1988 deaths